Jean-Jacques Lamboley (10 August 1920 – 20 July 1999) was a French cyclist who specialised in motor-paced racing. In this discipline he won two national titles, in 1947 and 1948, as well as the UCI Motor-paced World Championships in 1948.

References

1920 births
1999 deaths
French male cyclists
People from Héricourt, Haute-Saône
UCI Track Cycling World Champions (men)
French track cyclists
Sportspeople from Haute-Saône
Cyclists from Bourgogne-Franche-Comté